The badminton women's team tournament at the 1990 Asian Games in Beijing Sports Complex, Beijing took place from 28 September to 30 September.

Schedule
All times are China Standard Time (UTC+08:00)

Results

Quarterfinals

Semifinals

Final

References
Results

Women's team